Hidden Track (尋找周杰倫) is a film based in Hong Kong with a mixture of Mandarin and Cantonese speakers.

Cast
 Po Lok-Tung - Pu Pu
 Shawn Yue - Yu Wenle
 Daniel Wu 
 David Wu - Ng Dai-Wai
 Ah Niu - Chan Hing-Cheung
 Denise Ho - Wan-Si
 Eason Chan (Yik-Shun) - Chen Yixun
 Emme Wong - Yi-Man
 Tang Siu-Yun
 Jay Chou - Himself

Plot
Pu Pu is dumped by her boyfriend whom she loves. Before she moves out, she asks to listen to "their song" just one more time, that is the hidden track by Jay Chou. Then she leaves him and goes to her sister's place in Hong Kong. All the while she is there, she searches for the same song, the "hidden track", and from this it leads her onto a journey of discovering love and a new beginning. Despite the whole movie revolving around Jay Chou's song, Jay Chou plays only a cameo part.

Awards
23rd Annual Hong Kong Film Award
• Nomination - Best New Artist (Po Lok-Tung)

External links
 IMDb entry
 loveHKfilms entry

Hong Kong romance films
2003 films
2000s Hong Kong films